Dr. Cholenahalli Nanjappa Manjunath (born 20 July 1957) is an Indian cardiologist and the director of the Sri Jayadeva Institute of Cardiovascular Sciences and Research. He is reported to have developed a new protocol in balloon mitral valvuloplasty and is credited with the performance of the highest number of such procedures using Accura balloon catheter in India.
The Government of India awarded him the fourth highest civilian honour of the Padma Shri, in 2007, for his contributions to Indian medicine. He Inaugurated the 410th edition Of Mysuru Dasara on 17 October 2020 which is the Nadahabba (State festival) as a mark of honour for Corona warriors in the COVID-19 pandemic.

He is a recipient of the 1998 Rajyotsava Prashasti, the second highest civilian award of the Government of Karnataka.

Biography 
Born to Chamaraje Gowda in the Hassan district of the south Indian state of Karnataka, Dr. Manjunath graduated in medicine from Mysore Medical College, secured his MD from the Bangalore Medical College and Research Institute and a DM in Cardiology from Kasturba Medical College, Mangalore. He started his career as an intern at Bangalore Medical College in 1982 and moved to Kasturba Medical College, Mangalore in 1985 as a senior registrar at the department of cardiology, staying there for three years. In 1988, he joined Sri Jayadeva Institute of Cardiovascular Sciences and Research as a member of faculty and worked there in various capacities such as Assistant Professor and the Professor of Cardiology till he was appointed as the director of the institution in 2006.

Dr. Manjunath is reported to have been the innovator of a new method of balloon mitral valvuloplasty. His researches have been published in several articles and scientific papers published in peer reviewed national and international journals; PubMed, an online repository of medical data has listed 73 of his articles. He is known to have performed over 26,000 interventional procedures and is credited with the highest number of balloon mitral valvuloplasties using Accura balloon catheter in India. He is associated with Mallige Medical Centre, Bangalore as a consultant and is a member of the Indian Medical Association. He has also served as the president of the Indian College of Cardiology. The Government of Karnataka awarded him the Rajyotsava Prashasti in 1998 and he received the fourth highest Indian civilian honour of the Padma Shri in 2007. Rajiv Gandhi University of Health Sciences (RGUHS) honoured him in 2012 with the degree of Doctor of Science (Honoris causa).

Dr. Manjunath is married to the daughter of former Prime Minister of India, H. D. Deve Gowda and the family lives in Bengaluru. His life has been documented in a biography, Biography of a living legend.

See also 

 Sri Jayadeva Institute of Cardiology
 H. D. Deve Gowda

References 

Recipients of the Padma Shri in medicine
1957 births
People from Hassan district
Medical doctors from Karnataka
Recipients of the Rajyotsava Award 1998
Indian cardiologists
Interventional cardiology
Indian medical researchers
Indian medical academics
Indian medical writers
Living people
20th-century Indian medical doctors